Dovedale is a village in Central District of Botswana. The village is located close to the Limpopo river and the border with South Africa, 50 km south-east of Mahalapye, and it has a primary school. The population was 706 in 2001 census.

References

Populated places in Central District (Botswana)
Villages in Botswana